Ismaïl Sbaï (born 6 August 1980 in Tangier) is a Moroccan racing driver who has competed in the World Touring Car Championship.

Career
Sbaï competed in the Moroccan Circuit Racing Championship between 2007 and 2009, winning the M1 Group in 2008.

Sbaï, along with compatriots Youssaf El Marnissi, competed in the 2010 FIA WTCC Race of Morocco, his home round of the World Touring Car Championship. The duo drove Chevrolet Lacettis for Maurer Motorsport. Sbaï retired from the first race and did not start the second race.

References

Living people
1980 births
People from Tangier
Moroccan racing drivers
World Touring Car Championship drivers